"Sexi Dance" is a song released from Paulina Rubio's fifth album, Paulina. It was written by Estéfano and produced by Marcello Azevedo. It entered Billboard Latin Pop Songs and peaked at #18. An English version of the song titled "Fire (Sexy Dance)" was released in 2002 as part of her crossover album Border Girl. It was a promotional single in USA and Universal Records released a vinyl with the original version.

Video
The song doesn't have an official music video, but Paulina performed the song at the Festival de Viña del Mar in 2002 and 2005.

Formats and track listings
Mexico CD single
 "Sexi Dance"

USA Vinyl, 12", Promo
 "Fire (Sexy Dance)"
 "Fire (Sexy Dance)"

Charts

References

 

 
2001 singles
Paulina Rubio songs
Spanish-language songs
Songs written by Estéfano